The 1897 Ohio State Buckeyes football team represented Ohio State University in the 1897 college football season.

Schedule

References

Ohio State
Ohio State Buckeyes football seasons
Ohio State Buckeyes football